Stowmarket High School is a co-educational secondary school and sixth form located in Stowmarket, Suffolk in England. It was at one time known as Stowmarket Grammar School.

 728 students from school years 7 to 13. This includes a sixth form which has a wide range of subjects available to study.

Previously a community school administered by Suffolk County Council, in September 2018 Stowmarket High School converted to academy status. The school is now sponsored by the Waveney Valley Academies Trust.

Notable former pupils 
Diarmaid MacCulloch – Oxford Professor of the History of the Church
Becky Jago – ITV newsreader
Sophie Stanton – actress
Kerry Ellis – actress and singer
Gareth Snell - politician and former MP for Stoke-on-Trent Central

References

External links

 

Secondary schools in Suffolk
Educational institutions established in 1909
1909 establishments in England
Stowmarket
Academies in Suffolk